Birchville usually refers to a suburb of Upper Hutt in New Zealand.  However, there are several other places in the world that either are, or have previously been named Birchville.  Consider these alternatives: 
 Birchville, California is a former settlement in Nevada County, California.
 Birchville was the original name of Pinos Altos, New Mexico, after Robert H. Birch and two other prospectors discovered gold there in 1860.
 Birchville is an inactive village placename in Massachusetts.
 Birchville, Texas, now a ghost town, in Hudspeth County, Texas, was a settlement on the San Antonio-El Paso Road and later a stagecoach station on the Butterfield Overland Mail route.

See also
 Birchville Cat Motel, a one-man musical experiment.